The Fergana peach, Prunus ferganensis, is either a species or a landrace of peach (Prunus persica), depending on the authority believed. P.ferganensis is found growing in, and takes its name from, the Fergana Valley of Central Asia. It differs from other domesticated peaches in having smaller fruit with no red blush, a groove in the pit, and unbranched leaf veins. In spite of these morphological differences, genetically P.ferganensis is deeply embedded within the domestic peach lineage.

References

ferganensis
Peaches
Fruits originating in Asia
Flora of Central Asia
Plants described in 1932